The Yankunytjatjara people, also written Yankuntjatjarra, Jangkundjara, and other variants, are an Aboriginal Australian people of the state of South Australia.

Language

Yankunytjatjara is a Western Desert language belonging to the Wati language family of the Pama-Nyungan languages.

Country
These lands took in the areas of the Musgrave Ranges, with their eastern frontier around the Everard Ranges.

Social organisation
Yankunytjatjara kinship terminology shares many common terms with the words for kinship in the Pintupi and Pitjantjatjara dialects.

Alternative names
 Alinjera. ('north')
 Ankundjara
 Everard Range Tribe
 Jangkundjadjara
 Jangundjara, Jankundjadjara, Jankunzazara, Jankuntjatjara, Jankuntjatara, Jankundjindjara.
 Kaltjilandjara. (a Pitjantjatjara exonym, but referring to the most southwestern of the Yankuntjatjarra hordes).
 Nankundjara (typo?)
 Wirtjapakandja
 Yankunjara, Yangundjadjara, Janggundjara, Jangwundjara. (typo)

Notable people 
 Eileen Kampakuta Brown, anti-nuclear activist and Goldman Environmental Prize winner
 Yami Lester, anti-nuclear and indigenous rights advocate
 Tali Tali Pompey, artist
 Whiskey Tjukangku, elder, and artist

Notes

Citations

Sources

Aboriginal peoples of South Australia